Robin Rönnlund is a Swedish archaeologist of the University of Thessaly and Swedish Institute at Athens, known for his work in and on Ancient Thessaly.

Education and career
Rönnlund received his Bachelor's and master's degrees in Classical Archaeology and Ancient History at Stockholm University, before continuing to complete a PhD in the same subject at the University of Gothenburg. The topic of his doctoral thesis was Greek akropoleis and their function and symbolic meaning in ancient society. Rönnlund is currently the Wenner-Gren fellow at the department of History, Archaeology and Social Anthropology at the University of Thessaly, researching cyclic urbanism in the ancient Greek world.

Having led the work in the field since 2016, Rönnlund took over the role of director for the Swedish side of the Greek-Swedish survey of the archaeological site at Thessalian Vlochos from Helene Whittaker of the University of Gothenburg. The work, which is a collaboration with the Ephorate of Antiquities of Karditsa, focusses on mapping and understanding the complex series of discrete urban remains at the site, how and when they were established and why they were so completely abandoned.

Selected publications

R. Rönnlund (2018), A city on a hill cannot be hidden: Function and symbolism of ancient Greek akropoleis. PhD thesis.
R. Rönnlund (2015), 'All that we see or seem: Space, memory and Greek akropoleis''', Archaeological Review from Cambridge'', pp. 37–43.

References

Living people
1985 births
Swedish archaeologists
Stockholm University alumni
University of Gothenburg alumni
People from Solna Municipality